Veer Bahadur Singh Purvanchal University (VBSPU), formerly Purvanchal University, is a public state university based in Jaunpur, Uttar Pradesh, India.  It was established in 1987 as a residential-cum-affiliating university. It is named after Shri Veer Bahadur Singh, the former chief minister of Uttar Pradesh.

The university is engaged in research through MoU with foreign and local universities, organizations and institutions. Many of its departments are identified by UGC as Centres of Excellence Aditya Banerjee student .

History
Purvanchal University, Jaunpur renamed as Veer Bahadur Singh Purvanchal University in the honour of late Shri Vir Bahadur Singh, former Chief Minister of the state, was established on 2 October 1987 as an affiliating university under U.P. state university act 1973. Started with the 68 affiliated colleges, the university now has widened its spectrum of activities with 367 affiliated graduate and post-graduate colleges and student enrollment of nearly three lakh and eighty thousand in five districts of Eastern Uttar Pradesh.

Campus 

The university is about 11 km from the historic city of Jaunpur on Jaunpur-Shahganj road which divides its 171.5-acre (0.694 km2) campus into two parts: one with the campus and another with a hostel, teacher's colony, transit hostel, guest house, chancellor suite and vice chancellor residence.

Auditorium

The university auditorium has a capacity of 1000 students. It is fully air conditioned with wooden work on the stage lot of space in front. The auditorium has separate rooms and other basic facilities for conducting special programmes like convocation, national and international level conferences, and many other academic and cultural events.

Organisation and administration

Faculties 

Faculty of Engineering and Technology
 Departments
 Computer Science and Engineering (CSE)
 Information Technology (IT)
 Electrical Engineering (EE)
 Mechanical Engineering (ME)
 Electronics and Communication Engineering (ECE)
 Electronics and Instrumentation Engineering (EIE)

Faculty of Management Studies
 Departments
 Business Management (includes MBA, Agri Business and e-Commerce)
 Finance and Control
 Business Economics
 Human Resource Development (HRD)

Faculty of Computer Applications
 Departments
 Computer Applications (BCA and MCA)

Faculty of Medicine
 Departments
 Pharmacy (D.Pharm. and B.Pharm)

Faculty of Commerce
 Department
 Bachelor of Commerce (Hon.)

Faculty of Science
 Departments
 Biotechnology
 Microbiology
 Biochemistry
 Environmental Science

Faculty of Applied Social Sciences
 Departments
 Social Science
 Applied Psychology
 Mass Communication

Faculty of Law
 Departments
 Integrated B.A. L.L.B.

Institutes 
Prof. Rajendra Singh Institute of Physical Science for Study & Research
 Department
 Mathematics
 Physics
 Chemistry
 Earth and Planetary Sciences
 Nanoscience and Technology
 Renewable Energy

Academics

Admission
Students are admitted to various courses based on the merit of a qualifying degree. To pursue post-graduation courses at Veer Bahadur Singh Purvanchal University, the candidate must have passed graduation with at least 45% marks from a reputable university in the relevant specialisation. Selection of candidates to MCA, MBA, B.Pharma and B.Tech. is done on the basis of marks obtained in the Uttar Pradesh State Entrance Examination (UPSEE), formally known as SEE-UPTU. Following the publication of the SEE-UPTU merit list, candidates need to appear for the counselling on the specified date and time at the allotted venue. The final list of candidates selected for admission is published on the university website thereafter.

Placement
The university has been in ties with the top companies offering various job roles and opportunities to the students at lucrative pay packages, ranging from INR 1.8 lakh to INR 8 lakh. Some of the key employers include Infosys, Paytm, Swiggy, Max Life Insurance, Zomato, LG Electronics, ICICI Prudential, Tech Mahindra, Kotak Mahindra Bank, Genpact and others.

Research

A committee is assigned to monitor research activity in the university. Over 60% of the faculty members have doctoral degrees and they are engaged in guiding research scholars. Faculty members are eligible to guide students after five years of teaching and publications in peer-reviewed journals. The Department of Biotechnology is one of the leading departments of the university. It was established in 1999. The department has good research facilities and the research groups, mainly the Human Molecular Genetics Laboratory and Molecular Biology Group, are involved in basic research.

Central Library

The Central Library was established in 1999. It shifted at newly three storied impressive modern library building with the name of Vivekanand Central Library in 2004, which was inaugurated by Bhairon Singh Shekhawat, the then-vice-president of India. In 2016, the Central Library was awarded as a "Centre of Excellence" by Government of Uttar Pradesh. The library premises are under CCTV surveillance to control unethical incidents. The library has Wi-Fi connectivity to provide internet as well as  facilities to its users even after closing the library.

The present library stock comprises 1,12,006 books, 318 professional Indian and foreign journals and magazines, 557 back volumes of journals, 10211 Ph.D. theses, 760 CDs, 12 newspapers, 216 government publications, and press clippings since 2008. The library has a reach collection of reference books including encyclopedias, dictionaries, yearbooks, atlases, directories, and almanacs.

It also has a book bank section to provide the complete set of textbooks for each student for all semesters.

Sports
A large open stadium of ground and sitting capacity of 5000 has been witnessing several sports finale of zonal, state and national level. The lush green ground has a well worked out track of meters. The lounge of the stadium includes rooms in first and second floor and other basic facilities useful for conducting sports, NSS, Rovers and Rangers programmes. In the recent years the university has conducted several sports events like All India Kabbaddi, basketball, handball, Inter-University Cricket tournament etc.

References

External links
Official Website
VBSPU Result Updates
VBSPU Time table Updates

Universities in Uttar Pradesh
Universities and colleges in Jaunpur, Uttar Pradesh
Educational institutions established in 1987
1987 establishments in Uttar Pradesh